The sixth season of JAG premiered on CBS on October 3, 2000, and concluded on May 22, 2001. The season, starring David James Elliott and Catherine Bell, was produced by Belisarius Productions in association with Paramount Television.

Plot 
Lieutenant Colonel Sarah "Mac" MacKenzie (Catherine Bell) and Commander Harmon "Harm" Rabb, Jr. (David James Elliott) are lawyers assigned to the Headquarters of the Judge Advocate General, an office in the Department of the Navy tasked with prosecuting and defending criminal cases under the Uniform Code of Military Justice (UCMJ). Harm and Mac investigate numerous occurrences, including espionage ("Legacy"), stowaways ("Florida Straits"), aircraft malfunctions ("Flight Risk"), breaches of religious law ("The Princess and the Petty Officer"), war crimes from the Vietnam War ("A Separate Peace"), and NATO collisions ("Collision Course"). Also this season, Bud (Patrick Labyorteaux) blames a Navy doctor for the death of his daughter ("Family Secrets"), Commander Caitlin Pike (Andrea Parker) returns to JAG HQ ("Touch and Go"), Admiral Chegwidden (John M. Jackson) heads a promotion board ("Baby, It's Cold Outside"), and Mic (Trevor Goddard) and Mac become engaged ("Lifeline"). Also, Harm becomes lost at sea ("Adrift"), Harriet is promoted to Lieutenant ("Lifeline"), and Mac prepares to give a historical lecture at the United States Naval Academy ("Mutiny").

Production 
The real Judge Advocate General of the Navy at the time, Rear Admiral Donald J. Guter, visited the set during the production of episode eighteen, titled "Liberty". 

Also this season, JAG filmed scenes at the Marine training facility Camp Pendleton, as "under an agreement with the Marine Corps, the show's producers get access to troops, combat equipment and military training in exchange for the service's approval of the scripts". Donald P. Bellisario credits the military as being particularly supportive, while series star Catherine Bell opined that JAG had become "the little show that could. It keeps going and growing".

Cast and characters

Main

Also starring

Recurring

Guest appearances

Episodes

See also
 2000–01 United States network television schedule

Notes

References 

06
2000 American television seasons
2001 American television seasons